Michael Hutchings may refer to:

Michael Hutchings (mathematician)
Michael Hutchings (chef)